The Ngbandi language is a dialect continuum of the Ubangian family spoken by a half-million or so people in the Democratic Republic of Congo (Ngbandi proper) and in the Central African Republic (Yakoma and others). It is primarily spoken by the Ngbandi people, which included the dictator of what was then known as Zaire, Mobutu Sese Seko.

Varieties
Northern Ngbandi is the lexical source of the trade language Sango, which has as many native speakers as Ngbandi and which is used as a second language by millions more in the CAR.

A variety of Ngbandi may have been spoken further east, in the DRC villages of Kazibati and Mongoba near Uganda, until the late 20th century, but this is uncertain.

Yakoma, with a central position on the Ubangi River that divides the CAR from the DRC, has a high degree of intelligibility with all other varieties of Ngbandi, though as with any dialect continuum, it does not follow that more distant varieties are necessarily as intelligible with each other as they are with Yakoma.

Gbayi or Kpatiri is a divergent Ngbandic language. Gbayi had likely been adopted by people who had formerly spoken a Zande language. Nzakara, a Zande language, is spoken near Gbayi. Perhaps not coincidentally, Kpatili also happens to be the name of a spurious Zande language for which there is no linguistic data.

Phonology
The phonology consists of the following:

Consonants 

 Sounds /l/ and /r/ alternate with each other.

Vowels

Writing system

References

Ubangian languages
Languages of the Democratic Republic of the Congo
Languages of the Central African Republic